Fakarava is a commune of French Polynesia in the archipelago of the Tuamotu Islands. The commune is in the administrative subdivision of the Îles Tuamotu-Gambier. The commune includes seven islands. The chef-lieu is the village Rotoava.

Geography
The commune of Fakarava consists of three associated communes: Fakarava (also including the atoll Toau), Kauehi (also including the atolls Aratika, Raraka and Taiaro) and Niau.

See also

 Communes of French Polynesia

References

External links

Communes of French Polynesia